Dimitri Musafia  is an artisan maker of violin and viola cases for his own company, Musafia. Residing in Cremona, Italy, he first trained as a violinist, and subsequently as a violin maker at the Stradivari Institute in Cremona, before self-teaching  to make cases, beginning in 1983, on the basis of his previous studies. 

A Musafia violin case has been made for violins and violas by Stradivari, Guarneri del Gesu, Amati and other makers of the classic period of violin making, including the 1742 Guarneri del Gesu called “the Cannon” once owned by Paganini and the 1715 Stradivari “ex-Joachim” or “the Cremonese”, part of Cremona’s Civic Collection since 1961 and considered by many as the finest violin in existence. 

Dimitri Musafia’s works have been commissioned by concert artists such as Salvatore Accardo, Anne-Sophie Mutter, Isaac Stern, Joshua Bell, Sarah Chang, Uto Ughi, Chloë Hanslip, as well as many concertmasters of important orchestras such as the Vienna Philharmonic, NHK Symphony Orchestra, New York Philharmonic, Metropolitan Opera of New York, Opera of Rome, La Scala di Milano, and others. 

For his merits in the field of violin case making, Dimitri Musafia has been defined the “Stradivari of violin case makers” by the City Council for the Arts of Cremona, Italy.

References
 City of Cremona, press release "Hypertechnological cases for the violins of the Civic Collection", in Italian language, February 28, 2005.
 City of Cremona, press release "Salvatore Accardo and Dimitri Musafia working together for charity", in Italian language, May 29, 2006.
 Strings magazine "All things strings", Feb/Mar 2001.
 Strings magazine "All things strings", April 2005.
 Corriere della Sera, national Italian newspaper "Musafia's work copied in China", in Italian language, July 12, 2005.
 AXA-Art international insurers "Conference on the safety of fine musical instruments", in Italian language, May 31, 2006.
 E-cremona web magazine "Violins safe in Musafia cases", in Italian language, September 27, 2007.

1962 births
Living people
People from Long Beach, California